Sandeep Malani (born 19 November 1971) is an Indian film director, documentary film maker, screenplay writer, and actor. He is the Managing Director of the Production Company 'Malani Talkies'.

Early years

Sandeep Malani was born in 1971 to a Roman Catholic family in Mumbai and was raised in Mangalore. Malani himself did his early schooling at the Milagres School in Mangalore. and his BBM at SDM College. Later he did Journalism course at Sandesha, Mangalore. Has been trained Japanese and speaks most of the Indian languages. His mother tongue is Konkani.
Malani was a choreographer and a dancer. He organised various events in Mangalore during 1992 to 1996 - all successful under the name 'Malani Presents - Something Special'
Malani was a film journalist for The Canara Times in Mangalore and later for a few years in The Times Of India, Bangalore. He also was a freelancer film critic for various websites and magazines.

Malani co-directed the Kannada film, Miss California, which was the debut film of actor Diganth.

He has variously served as a TV host for local Mangalorean channels, events organiser, costume designer and directed a few music videos for local channels involving dancers and stage artistes of Mangalore. Malani has acted in a few theatre plays as well.
 
Malani co-directed the Kannada film 'One Two Three' starring Prabhu Deva, Raju Sundaram, Prasad and Jyothika. The film was directed by K Subaash.

Sandeep Malani directed the Bollywood Film, 'Woh 5 Din' a suspense thriller shot in Barielly and Nainital with newcomers. Later he directed Kalpana Pandit, Akash Hora and Anant Nag in 'Janleva 555'. 

As a Screenwriter, Malani has assisted K Subaash in the writing of Rohit Shetty's film Chennai Express and also wrote the script of 'Hello India' starring Akshay Kumar.

Malani has also been a part of the direction team in Onir's I Am anthology film, working on the "I Am Abhimanyu" and "I Am Omar" segments.

He has directed a variety of short films, some of them covering controversial issues such as AIDS ("Jo Jo Laali – a heart wrenching lullaby") and homosexuality ("Shaayad"). His other short film was made in three languages: "Hum Tum Aur Loan" (Hindi), "Yella Ok, Loan Yaake" (Kannada) and "A Loanly Life" (English).

Filmography (as director and co-director)

Feature films

Short films

Documentaries

Selected filmography (as actor)

References

External links
 

Living people
1971 births
Sindhi people
Mangaloreans
Film directors from Mumbai
Indian documentary filmmakers
Indian male screenwriters
Male actors in Kannada cinema
Indian male film actors
21st-century Indian male actors
Male actors from Mumbai
Film producers from Mumbai